The sent-down, rusticated, or "educated" youth, also known as the zhiqing, were the young people who—beginning in the 1950s until the end of the Cultural Revolution, willingly or under coercion—left the urban districts of the People's Republic of China to live and work in rural areas as part of the "Up to the Mountains and Down to the Countryside Movement".

The vast majority of young people who went to the rural communities had received elementary to high school education, and only a small minority had matriculated to the post-secondary or university level.

Down to the Countryside Movement

After the People's Republic of China was established, in order to resolve employment problems in the cities, starting in the 1950s, youth from urban areas were organized to move to the rural countryside, especially in remote towns to establish farms. As early as 1953, the People's Daily published the editorial "Organize school graduates to participate in agricultural production labor". In 1955, Mao Zedong asserted that "the countryside is a vast expanse of heaven and earth, where we can flourish", which would become the slogan for the Down to the Countryside Movement.

Beginning in 1955, the Communist Youth League organized farming, and encouraged the youth to cultivate the land. From 1962, it was suggested that the Down to the Countryside Movement be nationally organized, and in 1964, the Central Committee of the Chinese Communist Party established an oversight group. In 1966, under the influence of the Cultural Revolution, university entrance examinations were suspended and until 1968, many students were unable to receive admittance into university or become employed.

Additionally, the Communist Party leadership sent youths to the countryside to help defuse the student fanaticism set in motion by the student Red Guards movement from 1966 to 1968. On December 22, 1968, Chairman Mao directed the People's Daily to publish a piece entitled: "We too have two hands, let us not laze about in the city", which quoted Mao as saying "The intellectual youth must go to the country, and will be educated from living in rural poverty." In 1969, many youth were rusticated. High school students were organized and assigned to the countryside on a national level.

Origins 
In the early days of 1966, when the Cultural Revolution was launched, student Red Guards attacked China’s educational system. On June 6, dozens of seniors from The Beijing No.1 Girls’ Middle School proposed to abolish the college entrance exams. They denounced the “old educational system,” which they regarded as “encouraging bourgeois ideology” and “helping the restoration of capitalism”. These students also sent a public letter to Chairman Mao Zedong, petitioning him to end the college entrance exams. In the letter, they wrote:“High school graduates should go to the workers, peasants, and soldiers, to unite with the workers and farmers, and to grow in the wind and waves of the Three Revolutionary Movements……. This is a new road, a new road leading to communism. We must, and will certainly be able to, make our proletariat road. Dear Party, Beloved Chairman Mao, the harshest place needs to be dispatched the youth around Chairman Mao. We are ready to go and are just waiting for your order". More students denounced the college entrance exams and called for their abolishment in the following days. The Chinese Communist Party’s central leadership supported the students’ proposal. In June, China’s State Council published an announcement which said to postpone “higher educational institutions’ work of recruiting new students”. On July 24, the State Council issued an additional announcement, “The Announcement on Reforming Higher Educational Institutions’ New Students Recruitment”. The State Council wrote that it decided to cancel college entrance exams in the announcement.

Because of the student Red Guards’ attacks on schools and the central government’s approval, students who graduated in 1966 from middle schools could not enter high schools, and those who graduated from high schools could not go to universities. Meanwhile, as the chaos in the Cultural Revolution caused the industrial and agricultural productions to plunge, jobs available to these students were minimal. The number of students, who graduated from middle or high schools but could not enter higher educational institutions reached 10 million in 1968. Those students, who graduated from middle or high schools in 1966, 1967, and 1968, were referred to as lao sanjie (“old three-classes”老三届). As few employment opportunities were available, they became surplus labor in the cities.

Two major political events during the Cultural Revolution marked the lives of lao sanjie: the Red Guards movement and the down to the countryside movement. In the second of half of 1966, many student Red Guards, realizing that they could not go on to study at universities, became all the more passionate exploring new opportunities to “unite with the workers and farmers” (与工农相结合). The idea of uniting with the workers and farmers was taught extensively at schools, and the lao sanjie were familiar with it. Since 1965, many middle schools had already started to organize students to go to the countryside to work for some time each semester, and government propaganda had been praising youths who labored in the fields. As a result, many lao sanjie initially went to the countryside voluntarily and enthusiastically.

It is in this context that ten students from the Beijing No.25 High School left Beijing for Inner Mongolia in 1967. On October 9, 1967, right before the ten students’ departure, thousands of people gathered at the Tian’anmen square to send them off. In front of a giant portrait of Chairman Mao, the students pledged their allegiance:“For the great cause to redden the world with Mao Zedong thoughts, we are willing to climb the mountains of sword and go down to the sea of fire. We have taken the first step in accordance with your great instruction, that the intellectuals should unite with the workers and farmers. We will continue walking on this revolutionary path, walking to its end and never turning back.”State media, including People’s Daily and Beijing Daily, reported the ten students’ departure from Beijing to Inner Mongolia extensively and approvingly. And the event marked the beginning of the down to the countryside movement.

Voluntary to mandatory 
The initial phase of the down to the countryside movement, marked by the departure of students from Beijing No.25 High School in October 1967, was voluntary. In Shanghai, in August 1968, forty-five students from the city became the first voluntary delegation who left for the countryside. The Shanghai municipal government arranged a reception for the students, who were named “our city’s little soldiers” by Jiefang Daily, on the morning of their departure. The Shanghai government applauded the students’ choice and told them to continue learning from Mao’s works, and to study from the peasants and participate in class struggle.

However, the number of students, who volunteered to go to the countryside was far smaller than the total number of graduates, who could neither continue their studies nor find a job. In Beijing, the number of lao sanjie was more than 400,000, but until April 1968, only a few thousand of them volunteered to go to the countryside.

Meanwhile, from late 1967 to spring 1968, other municipal and provincial government offices started encouraging and organizing students to go to the countryside. On December 12, 1967, the municipal government of Qingdao, Shandong province, organized a farewell ceremony to send off the city’s first batch of students to the countryside. Less than a month later, on January 4, 1968, the Shandong Provincial Revolutionary Committee held a meeting where it was requested that all educated youth in the cities go to the countryside.[5] In March, the Heilongjiang Provincial Revolutionary Committee published an announcement which explicitly stated that its priority in allocating the graduated students was to send them to the countryside.

On April 4, 1968, the central government endorsed a second announcement the Heilongjiang Provincial Revolutionary Committee published, which stressed that graduated students should primarily be assigned to go to the countryside. The central government and Mao also commented on the announcement, requesting local government offices to assign graduated students to suitable places based on “four directions,” which included the countryside, frontier regions, factories and mines, and “jiceng (grassroots places, 基层).” The central government’s endorsement and commentary precipitated local government offices to make greater efforts sending off school graduates. As most factories did not have new jobs available and many had their productions halted because of the Cultural Revolution, local governments mobilized graduates to relocate to the countryside and frontiers.

On April 21, 1968, the Beijing Municipal Revolutionary Committee made an announcement, requesting schools to strengthen political and ideological education to change the views of those who did not want to go to the countryside. The Committee also set up several new teams to mobilize the students. Meanwhile, mass propaganda had also been launched to expedite the mobilization. In July, several newspapers published the reprints of oil painting “Chairman Mao Going to Anyuan 毛主席去安源,” calling for the students to follow Mao’s revolution. In Shanghai, the municipal city government set up an office in June to supervise the mobilization. In the same month, the Shanghai Party Committee also organized a large-scale rally to persuade middle and high school graduates to go to the countryside.

On August 18, 1968, People’s Daily published a commentary commemorating the second anniversary since Mao first inspected the Red Guards. The commentary, “Firmly Embarking on the Path of Uniting Workers, Farmers, and Soldiers,” stated that one’s willingness to go to the countryside to unite the farmers and workers showed one’s loyalty to Chairman Mao’s revolution. At the same time, local governments had also been adopting more forceful measures to push students to go to the countryside. In Beijing, factories did not receive any new school graduates, and government work teams were assigned to warn the students that they would face the consequences if they refused to go to the countryside. For the families deemed to have political issues, their children must also go to the countryside or frontier regions. Otherwise, the families would be treated as class enemies and be struggled against.

On December 22, 1968, People’s Daily published an article on its front page praising city residents in Huining County, Gansu province, resettling in the countryside. The editor’s note accompanying the article quoted a directive from Mao. “Chairman Mao has recently instructed us,” the editor’s note went, “that the educated youth must go to the countryside and to receive re-education from the poor, lower and middle peasants.” (see also: social structure of China) This directive marked the watershed moment that going to the countryside became mandatory for students who graduated from middle or high schools in the cities. For the rural villages, it also became mandatory for them to receive and allocate these students. With the publication of Mao’s directive, sending educated youth in the cities to the countryside had quickly swept through China. In 1969, more than 2.6 million students from cities were sent to the countryside, making the total number of sent-down youth from 1967 reach almost 4.7 million.

Hesitant reception 
Although both the central and local governments pushed hard with propaganda campaigns and various strategies to relocate graduated students from the cities to the countryside, some city residents and rural village officials showed ambivalence towards the mandate. Many families in Shanghai tried to negotiate for their children to have the best arrangements. For instance, one father there persuaded the leader of a working team to let the family’s two daughters be sent to the same place in Jiangxi Province. Some families in Shanghai tried to have their children sent to nearby provinces in Zhejiang and Jiangsu. And still, some disapproved the down-to-the-countryside mandate. In one factory in Shanghai, 100 study sessions were held in 1969 to persuade the workers to send their children to the countryside. Some Shanghai residents even damaged homes of members of the street party committee who visited families, persuading them to adhere to the mandate. In Shanghai, the families with a working-class background and those who lived in shanty housing neighborhoods were the most difficult to persuade to send their children to the countryside. In summer 1969, at the Shanghai Number 11 Textile Mill, 20 percent of the students, who were children of the factory workers, remained home after being requested to go to the countryside.

One of the reasons it was more difficult to mobilize working-class families was that they had a more privileged class background than the families of intellectuals or those placed into the bad class categories. Their employment at the state-owned factories also gave them more bargaining power because although the factories could pressure them, their jobs were mostly stable. It was even more challenging for the local government in Shanghai to persuade families that lived in shanty neighborhoods to send their children to the countryside. One government report written in 1969 documented that, in the Yaoshuilong neighborhood in Jiaozhou district in Shanghai, 70 percent of graduated students refused to go to the countryside. Although most lao sanjie eventually were sent to the countryside, it was difficult to know how many went willingly.

Like many Shanghai families who were not enthusiastic about sending their children to the countryside, some cadres in rural villages were also not excited about the arrival of the urban youth. Many village officials first learned about the news from radios and broadcasts. A senior provincial official from Anhui province, who was sent to the villages to oversee the sent-down youth mobilization, wrote that local county and village officials were unprepared for the task of allocating the urban youth and “were afraid to make mistakes.” In Heilongjiang Province, local village officials scrambled to transport the sent-down youth from train stations to villages. In some villages in Heilongjiang, it was also challenging for the local officials to find enough housing and sufficient food to settle many urban youth.

Apart from the urban residents and the rural village officials’ ambivalent attitudes towards the sent-down youth movement, some local villagers were also unsure how to deal with the urban youth sent to their villages. In the Ganchazi commune in Heilongjiang, eighty-six youth from Shanghai---many who had troubled records and served time in Shanghai’s juvenile detention---were sent there. Locals found it challenging to deal with these youth who reportedly fought among themselves, gambled, drank, stole, and killed animals. Local villages in Anhui province that received youth from Shanghai who had criminal records encountered similar issues. The head of the Anhui Provincial Office of Sent-Down Youth reported that the local villagers “hated them, but they were afraid to say anything.” (see also: people's commune). 

Rustication did not end the Cultural Revolution in the minds of many sent-down youth. Many continued to organize study groups on social issues. Some even organized underground cells in case the opportunity for rebellion appeared again, although these groups were the minority.

Development

From 1962 to 1979, no fewer than 16 million youth were displaced (some sources set the minimum at 18 million). Although many were directed to distant provinces such as Inner Mongolia, the usual destinations for the sent-down youth were rural counties in neighboring areas. Many of the Red Guards from Shanghai travelled no further than the nearby islands of Chongming and Hengsha at the mouth of the Yangtze.

In 1971, numerous problems with the movement began to come to light, at the same time as the Communist Party allocated jobs to the youth who were returning from the country. The majority of these re-urbanized youth had taken advantage of personal relations (guanxi) to leave the countryside. Those involved with the "Project 571" coup denounced the entire movement as being disguised penal labor (laogai). In 1976, even Mao realized the severity of the rustication movement and decided to reexamine the issue. But in the meantime, over a million youth continued to be rusticated every year. Many students could not deal with the harsh life and died in the process of reeducation.

The urban-rural gap 
Before the arrival of the urban youth, many local officials were concerned that the students from the cities would add extra burdens, especially financial ones, to them. For instance, a county official in Huma in Heilongjiang wrote a report to the provincial government that the county did not have enough land and other materials to allocate and support the 6000 youth assigned to live there. The county needed additional financial subsidies to settle them.

And when many sent-down youth arrived in the rural regions they were assigned to, they were appalled by the poverty and the poor living conditions in many villages. In the case of the Shanghai sent-down youth, the differences between the rural and frontier regions and Shanghai were even more shocking. The sent-down youth from Shanghai brought with them clothes, bedding, soap, bowls, food, and when they returned home for a visit each year, they brought back with them more goods, some of which were also wanted by local villagers. In some villages in Yunnan, the Shanghai sent-down youth traded goods they bought in Shanghai, such as clothes, soap, candies, with local villagers in exchange for local agricultural produces.

But one of the most significant benefits for having sent-down youths from big cities was that local villages and cadres, through connections they made with the sent-down youth and municipal offices, acquired materials, including tools for agricultural work and even for factories. In one case, officials from Heilongjiang went to the Shanghai Sent-down Youth office in fall 1969. They requested that Shanghai dispatch materials to Heilongjiang to accommodate the sent-down youth from Shanghai there. And Shanghai municipal government not only sent supplies for the Shanghai sent-down youth in Heilongjiang, but they also sent “two buses, thirteen trucks, nine tractors, thirty-six hand-operated tractors, and several cars, with a total value of 1.06 million yuan” to facilitate with the local government’s allocation of urban youth.

To help provide more jobs for the sent-down youth in rural regions, the Shanghai municipal government also helped rural places set up factories to allocate the sent-down urban students. For example, local officials in the Jinghong district in Yunnan province proposed to officials in Shanghai that they wanted to build a factory manufacturing wooden products. The factory would provide jobs for the Shanghai sent-down youth there. And the Shanghai government provided equipment, loans, and technicians from Shanghai to Jinghong to help build the factory. Like Shanghai, the Beijing municipal government also provided agricultural and industrial equipment, and large quantities of goods, to rural regions to help settle the sent-down youth.

Although it was impossible to quantify how much urban cities’ transfer of goods and equipment and support with building factories helped to drive rural economic growth in the down-to-the countryside movement during the Cultural Revolution, the transfer of goods, money, and technology from urban to rural places---because of the existence of urban sent-down youth in rural regions---nonetheless played a significant role in rural regions’ economic development in this time. In the words of scholars Emily Honig and Xiaojian Zhao, the sent-down youth “sometimes unwittingly and sometimes intentionally, created connections that transcended the rural-urban Divide of Maoist China.”

Gendered experiences

Female sent-down youth

Not suitable for agricultural work 
Living conditions in the villages where the urban youth were sent varied, depending on whether they were sent to frontier regions such as Inner Mongolia or Heilongjiang, rural areas not too far from Shanghai or Beijing, or elsewhere in inland provinces. But regardless of the different locations they were sent to, urban youth found it challenging to perform heavy agricultural work alongside the villagers. For female sent-down youth, working in villages was particularly challenging. Some villagers listed five types of sent-down youth they did not want, and female ones were listed among the five types. One person in a commune in Heilongjiang commented on the lack of physical strength of sent-down youth, particularly females, to perform agricultural work. The person said: “three sent-down youth cannot match the abilities of one local. And two female sent-down youth cannot match the work of one male.”

Female sent-down youth lacked physical strength compared to their male counterparts and the villagers performing agricultural work. They also had to deal with illnesses caused by working in unfavorable conditions. According to a report from a county in the northeastern Jilin Province, 70 percent of the female sent-down youth in the county had “female illnesses” after they worked in “wet fields during their menstrual periods.” The report blamed the local village officials for requesting the female sent-down youth to do the same work as the male sent-down youth; it also blamed the females themselves for not being aware of their health. Wu Jianping, a female student from Beijing sent to Heilongjiang when she was 16, said that the sent-down students were all very “enthusiastic” working in the fields. Female sent-down youth did not tell others when they menstruated but continued working in the wet fields. As a result, many sent-down youth, said Wu, suffered from arthritis when they grew older. Feng Jifang, a female student from Harbin who was sent to a state-owned farm in Bei’an county in Heilongjiang, also when she was 16, said she did not have enough nutritious food to eat despite the heavy farm work she performed. She would not even menstruate because of a lack of nutrition. Feng said that she had arthritis and developed pains in her spine, ankles, and wrists due to working on the farm as a teenager.

Marriages 
The marriage law that took into effect in the 1950s in the PRC made explicit distinctions between men and women. It requested that the minimum age for marriage for men was twenty, and women eighteen. In the 1970s, the government advocated for late marriages and made distinctions between the urban and the rural when setting the minimum age for marriages. For urban residents, the new minimum age for marriages was set at twenty-eight for men and twenty-five for women. For rural residents, the minimum marriage age was twenty-five for men and twenty-three for women. For the female urban youth who went to the villages between 1966 to 1968 and were then categorized as rural residents, they reached the minimum age for late marriages in around 1973. Once one reached the minimum age for marriage, pressures from the society mounted for the youth to get married. Some young female sent-down youth from families with problematic class backgrounds also viewed marrying local peasants as a way to mend their bad class background.

Messages on marriages from the central government concerning the sent-down youth seemed mixed. In the late 1960s and early 1970s, when the down to the countryside movement was in its prime, propaganda from the news media, to create further momentum for the movement, enthusiastically advocated for the sent-down youth to “put down their roots for the whole life” in the villages, and to get married and settle in the rural regions. But at the same time, the government also campaigned for late marriages. This paradox was reflected in a People’s Daily commentary on June 26, 1969. The commentary, titled “A Wild World with Great Potentials” (guangkuo tiandi dayou zuowei 广阔天地大有作为), in one paragraph called for the sent-down youth to settle their roots in the countryside, and in another stressed that it was important for the youth to get married late. Several months later, in March 1970, at a conference held in Beijing about the sent-down youth, attendees again stressed that sent-down youth should get married late.

Propaganda calling for the sent-down youth to marry late became more intense in the early 1970s. On July 9, 1970, an article published on the People’s Daily stated that whether the sent-down youth married late mattered greatly to class struggle. According to the article, “the poor and middle peasants are educating the sent-down youth to deal correctly with marriage issues and persuade them to marry late. Late marriage must be understood as part of class struggle. The instances of early marriage reflect class enemies trying to undermine the movement.” At a working meeting discussing the sent-down youth held in 1973, attendees---including former model sent-down youths and premier Zhou Enlai, discussed how much money a sent-down youth couple would need to construct a new house and buy furniture for themselves if they get married. Zhou commented at the meeting that the sent-down youth could spend seven to ten years in the countryside until they accumulated more resources, and then with some subsidies, Zhou said, they could get married and build themselves a house.

Scholars Xiaomeng Liu and Michel Bonnin wrote that the government’s concerns about controlling the population and housing costs were the main reasons behind its push for late marriages among the sent-down youth. While scholars Emily Honig and Xiaojian Zhao interpreted that, the government’s late marriage advocacy aiming for sent-down youth were to maintain the urban-rural divide because one character that marked the urban population’s difference from the rural villagers was that the former did not practice early marriages as the latter group did.

A watershed moment in the development of the marriage policy occurred in early 1974, when Bai Qixian, a college graduate from Hebei who married a local peasant wrote letters to several newspapers. Bai’s family opposed her decision when she married a peasant in the village where she was sent down. Bai shouldered much of the homework and took care of her parents-in-law. Still, the couple fought, and Bai’s husband often beat her. Bai’s marriage was mocked by the villagers frequently. Enraged, Bai wrote letters to newspapers at the end of 1973. In the letters, Bai wrote:“Some people say that marrying a peasant is no good, but in my opinion, the kind of people who covet personal enjoyment and look down on farmers are the most pathetic… Some people say that staying behind in the countryside has no future, while I firmly believe that toiling in the vast countryside for one’s whole life is a great accomplishment and has a bright future.”When Bai sent her letters, it was when the Maoist left, led by Jiang Qing, was doubling down on the Campaign to Criticize Lin Biao and Confucius. The sent-down youth, especially those who married local peasants and “put down roots” in the villages, were praised as heroes. With this context, Bai’s marriage to the local farmer was set as an example, and state media used her story as propaganda to call for other sent-down youth to follow Bai. On January 27, 1974, Hebei Daily published Bai’s letter, praising it as a “model text” to “criticize Lin Biao and Confucius.” Not long after, People’s Daily published an article about Bai. With Bai gaining fame, other local governments also selected sent-down youths who married local farmers as honorary examples. All the models the local governments set up, whom the newspapers often praised for “breaking up completely with the old tradition,” were female sent-down youths.

From 1974 to 1976, the Maoist left vigorously promoted the sent-down youth to marry local farmers. Marrying villagers was praised as “breaking up completely with the old tradition” and supporting the political campaigns against Lin Biao and Deng Xiaoping. In Baoding in Hebei Province, rough statistics from 1978 showed that, among the sent-down youth who were married, 75.5% married local farmers. And in Jilin province, 74.9% of sent-down youth married local farmers in 1980.

Sexual violence 
In some rural regions, sent-down youth were reportedly abused by local officials and villagers. In June 1973, the National Working Conference on Sent-Down Youth was held in Beijing. Before the meeting, which lasted for six weeks, the State Council sent out working teams to 24 provinces to investigate the living conditions of the sent-down youth. The working teams reported that from 1969 to 1973, there were 23,000 incidents in which sent-down youth were mistreated or abused.

Out of the 23,000 incidents, 70% were about sexual violence committed against female sent-down youth. In the early 1970s, more cases of sexual violence committed against female sent-down youth were reported. In 1972, in Hebei province, out of all the reported claims that the sent-down youth were abused, 94% were about sexual violence committed against female sent-down youth. The percentage number in the same year in Jiangsu and Jilin was about 80%.

At the Inner Mongolia Production and Construction Corps, 11 such cases were reported in 1969; the number of cases rose to 54 in 1970 and 69 in 1972. From 1969 to 1973, 507 cases of sexual violence were reported in Guangxi Province. At the Heilongjiang Production and Construction Corps, 365 sexual violence cases had been reported from 1968 to 1973. In some reported cases, the female sent-down youth became pregnant after being raped. And in some cases---many of which were committed by local cadres of the villages or Production and Construction Corps, the female sent-down youth who were sexually assaulted suffered from physical or mental illnesses, and some died.

It was difficult to know how many female sent-down youth suffered from sexual violence. Many kept silent for fear that they might not return to the cities if they said anything. Some did not make their grievances public because victims of sexual violence were still stigmatized. Some who were from families with bad class backgrounds did not dare to report the local cadres who had power to retaliate against them.

Rural male peasants demonized, female peasants ignored 
Although it was impossible to calculate how many abuse or sexual violence cases were committed against the sent-down youth, its severity prompted the central government to issue a document, Document 21, in 1972. In December 1972, a schoolteacher from Fujian, Li Qinglin, wrote a letter to Mao. Li complained about how local cadres exercised their power over the sent-down youth and the poor living condition of his son, who was sent to a village. Mao wrote back to Li, promising that he would solve the problems. And to address the issue, Zhou Enlai and other top leaders held a meeting and produced Document 21, which stated that those who undermined the down-to-the-countryside movement and abused their power would receive punishment. Soon, a nationwide campaign swept through the country, and local officials felt pressure to produce reports and punish whoever could be categorized as undermining the movement. It was in this context that sexual relationships between sent-down youth and local villagers were criminalized.

Reports from 1973 suggested that languages used in government reports started to shift this year. Sexual relationships---including consensual ones---between female sent-down youth and local male villagers were increasingly described with the word jian, such as tongjian (extramarital sex), youjian (trick someone into sex), and qiangjian (rape). Before the central government held National Working Conference on Sent-Down Youth in June 1973, Zhou Enlai read reports about two severe cases of sexual violence against female sent-down youth; one committed by local state-owned military farm officials in Yunnan and the other local cadres in Heilongjiang. Enraged, Zhou ordered the Yunnan report sent to all participants of the National Working Conference on Sent-Down youth and required that attendees carry out comprehensive investigations about sexual violence after returning to their provinces. Other leaders at the conference requested that the cadres at the military farms in Yunnan be executed.

By the end of the national conference, on August 4, 1973, Document 30, which specifically forbade rape and forced marriage in the sent-down youth movement, was published. Local governments carried out extensive campaigns following Document 30, targeting not only for rape cases but also other forms of sexual assault. The campaigns were so intense that local officials, under pressure to produce reports, criminalized many sexual relationships, including consensual ones, between sent-down youth and local villagers. When local officials were still not able to draft up enough reports, in some cases they also dug up incidents from the past to criminalize sexual relationships.

In reports that concerned sent-down youth from Shanghai, all reports about sexual relationships that were criminalized had local male farmers as perpetrators and female sent-down youth as victims. In some cases, consensual sexual relationships were criminalized. In a few cases, even local farmers who married female sent-down youth were deemed perpetrators of sexual violence against their wives. Scholars Emily Honig and Xiaojian Zhao also proposed that, in the reports concerning Shanghai’s sent-down youth, it was plausible to suspect that local male farmers might have been “scapegoated of the powerful cadres accused of sexual assaults.” What was missing in these reports, however, was any mentions of local female farmers or male sent-down youth who might have been involved in sexual violence cases or other sexual relationships that the reports criminalized.

Although sexual abuse committed against the sent-down youth, predominantly female sent-down youth, was severe and widespread. The criminalization also included other sexual relationships between sent-down youth and local villagers, including consensual ones and even marriages. The reports concerning Shanghai’s sent-down youth showed the unbridgeable gap between the urban and the rural, and they are deeply gendered. Rural male peasants were demonized and portrayed as sexual predators, and victims were all urban female sent-down youth. Male sent-down youth who had sexual relationships with other women, including other sent-down youth and local female villagers, was not criminalized. And rural female peasants who might have suffered sexual violence or engaged in sexual relationships with sent-down youth were thoroughly excluded from the reports.

Rehabilitation
After Mao's death in 1976, many of the rusticated youth remained in the countryside. Some of them had married into their villages. In 1977, university entrance exams were reinstated, inspiring the majority of rusticated youth to attempt to return to the cities. In Yunnan in the winter of 1978, the youth used strikes and petitions to implore the government to hear their plight, which reinforced the pressing nature of the issue to party authorities.

On March 8, 1980, Hu Yaobang, General Secretary of the Central Committee of the Communist Party, proposed ending rustication. On October 1 of the same year, the party essentially decided to end the movement and allow the youth to return to their families in the cities. In addition, under age and marriage restrictions, one child per family of the rusticated youth was permitted to accompany their parents to their native cities.

In the late 1970s, the "scar literature" included many vivid and realistic descriptions of their experiences, becoming the first public exploration of the cost of the Cultural Revolution. A different kind of rustication literature, more nuanced in its evaluation of the experience, was inaugurated in the 1980s by the Shanghai writer, and former zhiqing, Chen Cun.

See also 

 Down to the Countryside Movement
 Cultural Revolution
 Scar literature

References

Further reading
Bernstein, Thomas P. (1977). Up to the Mountains and Down to the Villages: The Transfer of Youth from Urban to Rural China. New Haven, CT: Yale University Press.
Rene, Helena K. (2013). "China's Sent-Down Generation: Public Administration and the Legacies of Mao's Rustication Program". Washington, DC: Georgetown University Press. 
Yihong Pan. (2003). Tempered in the Revolutionary Furnace: China’s Youth in the Rustication Movement. Lanham, MD: Lexington Books.

 
Cold War history of China
Maoist terminology
Cultural Revolution